"Like a Virgin" is the eighth episode of the first season of the American mystery television series Veronica Mars. Written by Aury Wallington and directed by Guy Bee, the episode premiered on UPN on November 23, 2004.

The series depicts the adventures of Veronica Mars (Kristen Bell) as she deals with life as a high school student while moonlighting as a private detective. In this episode, when someone publicly releases the results of an online purity test and causes chaos at the school, Veronica goes on the case. Meanwhile, Veronica attempts to obtain information from the confessed killer of Lilly Kane (Amanda Seyfried), Abel Koontz.

Synopsis
Veronica looks at photos of Lilly Kane's murder site that she found earlier. Then, Cliff McCormack (Daran Norris) enters and Veronica asks him for entry into death row to see Abel Koontz (Christian Clemenson). Cliff denies her advances. Later that day, after gym class, Veronica finds that her clothes are missing and that someone stuffed them in the toilet. A cheerleader, Meg Manning (Alona Tal), gives her uniform to Veronica. Meg goes over to her friends, one of whom is Duncan Kane (Teddy Dunn), and they talk about a popular purity test. Later, Veronica and Wallace (Percy Daggs III) are hanging out, and Wallace's mom, Alicia (Erica Gimpel) eventually barges in and berates him privately for being friends with Veronica. Veronica finds a website where she can look up the results of anyone's purity test. There is chaos at school the next day after someone makes the results of the test public. Veronica then tells Meg that she will find the person who made the test public. The next day, Veronica meets Mac (Tina Majorino) when she needs help with a computer problem. They start to investigate who made the results public. Later, Veronica spies Alicia with a man (Joel Bissonnette) at night. Later that day, Veronica meets Meg, who tells her that she is being harassed. It turns out that Meg's sister actually created and published a test specifically for her.

Veronica goes to an attractive IT faculty member, who refuses to give her a student's password. A few moments later, Meg fails her audition for Cabaret when other students harass her. Veronica emails Abel Koontz under a fake name in order to get access to his cell. Later, Keith (Enrico Colantoni) fails to convince Mrs. Fennel to give her his help with the tenant (the man we saw earlier), who was being abusive towards her. In addition, Veronica receives a call which states that Koontz has accepted her visitation request. The next day, Veronica questions Meg's sister, but she says that Meg didn't come to school that day. It turns out that Meg received erotic letters from a crush when on vacation. Wallace decides to sleep over at Veronica's house after the tenant becomes more disruptive. Keith does some work on the Fennel case and eventually catches the thief attempting to steal some food. Keith attempts to force him to leave the house by 6:00 AM. He eventually succeeds. Veronica does some more research with Mac, and they eventually find that someone is logged onto Veronica's account. Veronica eventually finds an empty computer in the journalism room which contains an embarrassing untrue email.

Veronica eventually tracks down the suspect (the IT guy) while he is having sex in a car. She confronts Kimmy (Annie Abrams), the girl who was involved with the IT man, but she states that she was not involved with Veronica's purity test leak, only Meg's. She blames another student, Pam (Shanna Collins), for Veronica's cyberbullying. Later, Meg thanks Veronica. Veronica talks to Duncan and says that the email was fake. However, he jokingly responds, indicating a possible new emotional connection between the two. Mrs. Fennel visits Keith and thanks him, also indicating that they will allow their children to still be friends. Veronica visits Abel Koontz. The visit starts to go well, but Abel once again confesses to the murder and states that he recognizes her. He puts it in her mind that she is possibly not Keith's daughter and is in fact the daughter of Lianne (Corrine Bohrer) and Jake Kane (Kyle Secor). Veronica gets into her car and breaks down sobbing.

Cultural references 
A variety of pop culture references are made in the episode:

 The episode's title refers to Madonna's sophomore album Like a Virgin and its lead single of the same name.
 Meg and Kimmy both audition for the lead role of Sally in Cabaret. In addition, the episode mentions the title song of the musical.
 Meg was the lead role in Guys and Dolls.
 Cole references the Lewinsky scandal when describing his relationship with Meg by using the phrase, "I did not have sexual relations with that woman."
 Veronica refers to the science fiction comedy film Repo Man.

Music 
The following music can be heard in the episode:
"Hands on the Money" by Kid Symphony
"Don't Tell Mama" from the musical Cabaret (sung by the characters Meg Manning and Kimmy)
"Don't Let It Get You Down" by Spoon

Production 

Series regulars Jason Dohring and Francis Capra, who portray Logan Echolls and Weevil Navarro, respectively, do not appear in "Like a Virgin." Although credited, Sydney Tamiia Poitier, who previously played Veronica's journalism teacher, Mallory Dent, does not appear, as her last episode was "The Girl Next Door". In addition, the episode features the first appearance of Cindy "Mac" Mackenzie, who would later become a series regular in the show's third season.

"Like a Virgin" also marks the first appearance of recurring character Meg Manning (Alona Tal), who would appear in ten episodes over the course of the show's first two seasons. During casting, Tal was series creator Rob Thomas's second choice for the character of Veronica Mars (after Kristen Bell). However, Thomas enjoyed Tal's audition so much that he created the character of Meg Manning specifically for her.

Reception

Ratings 

In its original broadcast, the episode was watched by 2.76 million viewers, ranking 92nd of 98 in the weekly rankings, marking a slight increase in viewers from the previous episode, "The Girl Next Door".

Reviews 

The episode received positive reviews from television critics. IGN ranked the episode ninth on its list of "The Top 10 Veronica Mars episodes," stating that, "The moment when Keith gets rid of Alicia's unwanted tenant is about the time you realize that a Keith-focused spinoff could be amazing." Price Peterson, writing for TV.com, lauded the episode, writing that "the high school scandals were fun and surprising, while the Lilly Kane investigation took a turn for the serious." In addition, the reviewer praised the final scene in which Veronica breaks down in the car. "It was the first time we'd seen such a raw display of emotion from our intrepid heroine, so it was as unsettling as it was heartbreaking. Poor Veronica!"

Rowan Kaiser of The A.V. Club, in a mixed review, stated that "As a vehicle for introducing moderately important new characters, [the episode] succeeds." However, the reviewer went on to write that the "major issue is that the plot is absolutely riddled with holes."

References

External links 

"Like a Virgin" at Mars Investigations

2004 American television episodes
Veronica Mars (season 1) episodes